Group D of the 1998 Fed Cup Europe/Africa Zone Group I was one of four pools in the Europe/Africa Zone Group I of the 1998 Fed Cup. Four teams competed in a round robin competition, with the top two teams advancing to the knockout stage.

Sweden vs. Hungary

Ukraine vs. Yugoslavia

Sweden vs. Yugoslavia

Ukraine vs. Hungary

Sweden vs. Ukraine

Yugoslavia vs. Hungary

  failed to win any ties in the pool, and thus was relegated to Group II in 1999, where they placed first in their pool of five, and thus advanced back to Group I for 2000.

See also
Fed Cup structure

References

External links
 Fed Cup website

1998 Fed Cup Europe/Africa Zone